Megastigmidae is a family of chalcid wasps in the order Hymenoptera. There are about 12 genera and more than 170 described species in Megastigmidae. Megastigmidae was formerly considered a subfamily of the family Torymidae.

Genera
These 12 genera belong to the family Megastigmidae:

 Bootanelleus Girault, 1915
 Bootania Dalla Torre, 1897
 Bootanomyia Girault, 1915
 Bortesia Pagliano & Scaramozzino, 1990
 Ianistigmus Boucek, 1988
 Macrodasyceras Kamijo, 1962
 Malostigmus Boucek, 1988
 Mangostigmus Boucek, 1986
 Megastigmus Dalman, 1820
 Neomegastigmus Girault, 1915
 Paramegastigmus Girault, 1915
 Westralianus Boucek, 1988

References

Parasitic wasps
Chalcidoidea
Apocrita families